Belarus competed at the 2015 European Games, in Baku, Azerbaijan from 12 to 28 June 2015.

Medalists

Archery

Belarus has qualified for three quota places in both the men's and the women's archery events at the Games, and as a result has also qualified for the team events.

Athletics
Men: Dmitri Barkalov, Andrey Likhovitski, Vasily Mikhalitsin 
Women: Svetlana Lifenko, Valeriya Tsekhmistrenko, Natalia Yakubova

Badminton

Men

Women

Beach volleyball
Men: Alexander Dedkov, Alexander Kovalenko 
Women: Viktoriya Shalayevskaya, Viktoriya Sekretova, Valeriya Babenko, Viktoriya Milevskaya

Boxing
Men: Ivan Figurenko, Dmitri Asanov, Vazgen Safaryantz, Evgeni Dolgolevets, Magomet Nurudinov, Vitali Bondarenko, Sergei Novikov, Leonid Chernobayev, Yan Sudilovski
Women: Yana Burim, Viktoriya Kebikova

Canoeing
 Men: Roman Petrushenko, Vitali Bel'ko, Oleg Yurenya, Pavel Medvedev, Vadim Makhnev, Taras Val'ko, Alexander Bogdanovich, Andrey Bogdanovich, Maksim Petrov, Kozyr Artyom, 
 Women: Marina Litvinchuk, Margarita Makhneva, Nadezhda Lepeshko

Cycling
Men: Vasily Kirienko, Konstantin Sivtsov, Evgeni Gutarovich
Women:Tatyana Sharakova, Yelena Omelyusik, Olga Antonova, Ksenia Tugai, Yelena Sitko

Diving
Men: Artyom Borovski, Yuri Novrozov
Women: Kristina Sheshko, Yulia Bandik, Yekaterina Veligurskaya

Fencing
Men: Alexander Buikevich, Sergey Byk 
Women: Darya Andreeva

Gymnastics

Artistic
Women's – 3 quota places

Rhythmic
Belarus has qualified one athlete after the performance at the 2013 Rhythmic Gymnastics European Championships.
 Individual – 1 quota place

Trampoline
Belarus qualified two athletes based on the results at the 2014 European Trampoline Championships. The gymnasts will compete in both the individual and the synchronized event.
 Men's – 2 quota place
 Women's – 2 quota places

Triathlon

Men's – Aliaksandr Vasilevich

References

Nations at the 2015 European Games
European Games
2015